Love's Frailties is a 1794 comedy play by the British writer Thomas Holcroft.

The original Covent Garden cast included William Thomas Lewis as Mr Muscadel, John Quick as Sir Gregory Oldwort, Joseph George Holman as Charles Seymour, Joseph Shepherd Munden as Mr Craig Campbell, Charles Farley as James, Jane Pope as Lady Fancourt and Isabella Mattocks as Nanette.

References

Bibliography
 Nicoll, Allardyce. A History of English Drama 1660–1900: Volume III. Cambridge University Press, 2009.
 Hogan, C.B (ed.) The London Stage, 1660–1800: Volume V. Southern Illinois University Press, 1968.

1794 plays
Comedy plays
West End plays
Plays by Thomas Holcroft